Tomás de Jesús Mangual (October 5, 1944–October 31, 2011) was a Puerto Rican investigative reporter who worked for El Vocero, a well-known newspaper in Puerto Rico.

Career
Mangual served in the United States Army during the Vietnam War era. Joined El Vocero, a well-known Puerto Rican newspaper, during the 1970s. While he was not the only reporter covering crime stories for El Vocero, his name was the most recognizable. Another one of his stories began with "A well-aimed stab to the heart..." His writing style earned him awards, but also criticism.

Criminal libel laws of Puerto Rico lawsuit
For many years, Mangual investigated crimes committed by politicians and police officers and was told he would be sued for libel by those he was investigating. In response, in 2003 Mangual became party to a lawsuit that said Puerto Rico's criminal libel laws were against Freedom of the Press. The lawsuit resulted in the criminal libel laws of Puerto Rico being struck down for being unconstitutional.

Mangual died in Mayaguez and is interred at the Las Mercedes Cemetery in Ponce, Puerto Rico.

See also

List of Puerto Ricans

References

1944 births
2011 deaths
Burials at Cementerio Las Mercedes
Puerto Rican journalists
United States Army soldiers
20th-century American journalists
American male journalists